Bayan Islamic Graduate School is a private, non-sectarian Islamic graduate school based in Orange, California with its campus located in Chicago, Illinois. It offers accredited Master of Arts degrees in four subject areas: Islamic Studies, Islamic Leadership, Islamic Education, and Advanced Islamic Theology as well as a Master of Divinity in Islamic Chaplaincy.

Bayan's degree programs are offered in partnership with the Chicago Theological Seminary (CTS), one of Chicago's oldest seminaries.

Bayan also offers several continuing education programs including a graduate certificate in conjunction with CTS, an Intensive Arabic Language course online, and unlimited access to self-paced courses in Islamic Studies, Chaplaincy, and other subjects through Bayan On-Demand.

History 
Bayan was established in 2011 through a collaboration with the Claremont School of Theology (CST) and the Islamic Center of Southern California with the purpose of preparing spiritual and religious leaders (such as pastors, priests, imams, and chaplains) who learn in an inter-religious environment. Bayan's first graduating class was in 2013.

In 2016, Bayan Launched the first 72-unit accredited M.Div. in Islamic Chaplaincy, and the first 48-unit accredited M.A. in Islamic Education in the United States.

In 2017, with the blessing of Muhammad Ali's family, Bayan launched a full-tuition scholarship for students who are working as leaders in underserved communities nationwide. During the same year, Bayan also launched Bayan On-Demand, a subscription platform giving the community access the same graduate courses Bayan students study with world-class instructors.

In 2019, Bayan formed a partnership with the Chicago Theological Seminary (CTS).

As of 2022, Bayan has 70 alumni.

Founder and president 
Jihad Turk is the founding president of Bayan. Prior to founding Bayan, Jihad served  as the Religious Director of the Islamic Center of Southern California, the oldest and largest mosque in the Los Angeles area.

Accreditation  
As of fall 2020, Bayan's degree programs are being offered in partnership with the world-renowned Chicago Theological Seminary (CTS), one of the earliest Chicago seminaries. Degree programs at CTS are accredited by the Association of Theological Schools (ATS) as well as the Higher Learning Commission (HLC) of the state of Illinois. CTS, founded in 1855, is affiliated with the United Church of Christ (UCC).

Bayan's programs constitute “concentrations” within established accredited degree programs of the host institution. The majority of program requirements are fulfilled by enrolling in courses provided by Bayan. In due course, Bayan intends to apply for independent accreditation with the appropriate regional bodies.

Bayan initially operated beginning in Fall 2011 as a division of the Claremont School of Theology (CST), which is accredited by the Western Association of Schools and Colleges (WASC) and the Association of Theological Schools (ATS). CST, founded in 1885, is affiliated with the United Methodist Church (UMC). CST's leadership took the pioneering step of incubating Bayan as one of the first Muslim American theological schools, with the purpose of enabling authentic Islamic education and leadership development, and sincere interreligious learning among students of various faith backgrounds. Bayan's academic partnership with CST will conclude in June 2021, with the graduation of Bayan students completing programs they began at CST.

Graduate degree programs 
As of 2022, Bayan offers five degree programs.

Master of Arts in Islamic Studies 
Master of Arts in Islamic Leadership
Master of Arts in Islamic Education
Master of Arts in Advanced Islamic Theology
Master of Divinity in Islamic Chaplaincy

Bayan On-Demand 
In 2017, Bayan launched BayanONLINE, now called Bayan-On-Demand, a digital learning platform that includes over 250 hours of course content that speak directly to a multitude of issues Muslims face today. The on-demand content is curated by Bayan's faculty and is the same instruction that degree-seeking students have access to. Bayan-On-Demand offers an “All Access Pass” which provides subscribers with full access to Bayan's digital content library. Bayan adds to its library on a regular basis.

As of summer 2022, courses available through Bayan On-Demand include:
Chaplaincy in Contexts
Foundation of the Islamic Worldview
Fundraising Strategies for Religious Non-Profits
Islam and Liberal Citizenship
Islam & West Africa
Islam in America
Islam in Blackamerica: From Slavery to Hip-Hop
Islamic Bioethics
Islamic History
Islamic Law and Legal Theory
Islamic Mysticism 
Islamic Spirituality & Leadership
Islamic Theology and Philosophy
Muslim Adolescent Identity Development 
Prophetic Biography
Prophetic Model of Ministry
Public Speaking: Islam & The Media
Self-Development and Spiritual Care
Universal Maxims In Islamic Law & Beyond

Notable faculty 
Bayan has its own faculty but also invites faculty from other institutions to teach courses in their hybrid intensive format (a format that utilizes online platforms as well as in-person teaching).

Dr. Asifa Quraishi, Professor of Law, University of Wisconsin-Madison
Dr. Umar Faruq Abd-Allah
Dr. Ovamir Anjum
Dr. Jonathan Brown, associate professor, Georgetown University
Dr. Hadia Abdullah
Dr. Walead Mosaad, Director of Muslim Student Life, Lehigh University  
Karima Alavi
Brie Loskota, co-director, American Muslim Civic Leadership Institute, University of Southern California  
Dr. Zareena Grewal, associate professor, Yale University
Dr. Sherman Jackson, King Faisal Chair of Islamic Thought and Culture and Professor of Religion and American Studies and Ethnicity at the University of Southern California
Edina Lekovic, public affairs consultant, Muslim Public Affairs Council
Dr. Su’ad Abdul-Khabeer, associate professor, University of Michigan
Dr. Joseph Lumbard, a co-author of The Study Qur'an
Dr. Rami Nashashibi, founder of the Inner-City Muslim Action Network
Dr. Omid Safi, Associate Professor of Islamic Studies, Duke University
Nadia Roumani, co-director,  American Muslim Civic Leadership Institute, University of Southern California
Shaykh Suhaib Webb
Dr. Ozgur Koca, author 
Najah Bazzy, RN, founder and CEO, Zaman International School
Elijah Reynolds, lecturer, Santa Clara University
Dr. Maria Massi Dakake
Dr. Kameelah Mu‘min Rashad
Dr. Hamada Altalib, assistant professor, Yale School of Medicine
Dr. Ihsan Bagby, associate professor, University of Kentucky
Dr. Reinhard Krauss, executive director, Academy for Judaic, Christian, and Islamic Studies
Salam Al-Marayat, president, Muslim Public Affairs Council
Shaykh Jihad Brown
Necva Özgür, executive director, MERIT
Dr. Hamid Mavani
Omar Suleiman (imam)
Dr. Aasim Padela, professor, Medical College of Wisconsin
Seyed Hadi Qazwini, Associate Imam, Islamic Education Center of Orange County
Tahara Akmal
Dr. Sylvia Chan-Malik
R, David Coolidge
Imam Suhaib Webb, International Scholar 
Dr. Kamran Aghaie, Associate Professor of Middle East Studies, University of Texas at Austin

Notable alumni 
 Basheer Jones, former member, Cleveland City Council
 Sondos Kholaki, Board Certified Hospital Chaplain, Cedars-Sinai Medical Center and Author
 Preacher Moss, author and comedian
 Dr. Jihad Saafir, founder and executive director, Islah LA

Notable support 
In 2020, Bayan received a grant of $234,500 from the Templeton Foundation to support Bayan's “Advanced Islamic Theology and Contemporary Thought Program.”  The project funding enabled Bayan to develop three new courses for an Advanced Islamic Theology concentration within the Master of Arts (MA) degree, inclusive of a special certificate given to students completing the course sequence. The courses have been developed based on a period of dedicated research and conceptualization by Resident Scholar Shaykh Jihad Brown.>

In 2021, Bayan received a $1,000,000 grant from the Annenberg Foundation to expand its programming.

References

External links 

Bayan/Chicago Theological Seminary
Bayan On-Demand

Graduate schools in the United States
Islamic seminaries and theological colleges
Universities and colleges in California
Universities and colleges in Chicago